The Vajrasana (diamond throne), or Enlightenment Throne of the Buddha, is an ancient stone slab located under the Bodhi tree, directly beside the Mahabodhi Temple at Bodh Gaya. The slab is thought to have been placed at Bodhgayā by Emperor Ashoka The Great of the Maurya Empire between 250-233 BCE, at the spot where the Buddha meditated.

The vajrasana is the bodhimanda (seat or platform of enlightenment) of Gautama Buddha. Being the site where Gautama Buddha achieved liberation, Tibetan texts also use the term vajrasana to refer to Bodh Gaya itself.

The empty throne was a focus of devotion in early Buddhism, treated as a cetiya or symbolic relic.  It was not intended to be occupied, but operated as a symbol of the missing Buddha. Ancient images show devotees kneeling in prayer before it, as they still do.

The throne

Discovery

The Vajrasana, together with the remnants of the ancient temple built by Ashoka, was excavated by archaeologist Alexander Cunningham (1814-1893), who published his discovery and related research of the Mahabodhi Temple in his 1892 book Mahâbodhi, or the great Buddhist temple under the Bodhi tree at Buddha-Gaya.

Description
As it survives now, the Vajrasana is a thick slab of polished grey sandstone, 7 feet 10-inches long by 4 feet 7-inches broad, and 6-inches thick. The whole top surface was carved with geometrical patterns, circular in the middle, with a double border of squares.

The sculpted decorations on the Diamond Throne clearly echo the decorations found on the Pillars of Ashoka. The Diamond Throne has a decorative band made on the sides of carvings of honeysuckles and geese, which can also be found on several of the pillar capitals of Ashoka, such as the Rampurva capitals, and also pigeons on the back relief, nowadays hidden from view. The geese (hamsa) in particular are a very recurrent symbol on the pillars of Ashoka, and may refer to the devotees flocking to the faith. The same throne is also illustrated in later reliefs from Bharhut, dated to circa 100 BCE.

The long frieze at the front is slightly different, and consists in stylized lotuses with multiple calyx, alternating with "flame palmettes" of a slightly simpler design than on the side. A rather similar design can also be seen in the lost frieze of the Allahabad pillar of Ashoka.

The vajrasana has carvings on all sides, suggesting that the original temple built by Ashoka (bodhigriha) was open on all sides, an hammiya structure. The small statues at the foot of the throne are of a later date, probably Kushan or Gupta.

Ashoka

The Vajrasana was built by Ashoka in order to mark the place where the Buddha reached enlightenment. Ashoka is thought to have visited Bodh Gaya around 260 BCE, about 10 years into his reign, as explained by his Rock Edict number VIII. He describes his visit to Bodh Gaya, known in ancient times as Sambodhi ("enlightenement") or Vajrasana ("Vajrasana"):

The throne slab dating from the time of Ashoka, was built when Ashoka established the first Bodh Gaya temple around the Bodhi tree circa 260 BCE. The throne was initially found hidden behind a bigger throne of the Kushan period, and an even bigger one, probably from the Pala period. It is thought that the Vajrasana was initially located at the bottom of the original Bodhi tree. The slab is made of polished sandstone, and dated to the time of Ashoka. This is the oldest known piece of architecture at Bodh Gaya.

Bharhut relief illustrating the Vajrasana

According to the inscribed Bharhut relief related to the Vajrasana, the original Mahabodhi Temple of Asoka was an open pavilion supported on pillars. In the middle is seen the Vajrasana decorated in front with four flat pilasters. Behind the Throne appears the trunk of the Bodhi Tree, which rises up high above the building, and on each side of the Tree there is a combined symbol of the Triratna and the Dharmachakra, standing on the top of a short pillar. On each side of the Vajrasana room there is a side room of the same style. The top of the Throne is ornamented with flowers, but there is no figure of Buddha.

The relief bears the inscription: "Bhagavato Sakamunino Bodho" ("The Bodhi (Tree) of the divine Shakyamuni", or "The illumination of the Blessed Sakyamuni"), thereby confirming the meaning of the relief.

Characteristics

Offerings

Various gold objects and a talisman with the impression of the bust of the Kushan ruler Huvishka were found buried under the Vajrasana.

See also
 Pillars of Ashoka
 Hellenistic influence on Indian art

Notes

References

 

Bodh Gaya
Mauryan art
Buddhist architecture
Sanskrit words and phrases
Memorials to Ashoka
Indian Buddhist sculpture